"Salva Mea" is a song by Belgian DJ Laurent Wéry. The song was written by Maxi Jazz, Ayalah Bentovim, Roland Armstrong and Laurent Wery, Sir-G. It was released in Belgium as a digital download on 3 January 2011.

Music video
A music video to accompany the release of "Salva Mea" was first released onto YouTube on 12 January 2011 at a total length of three minutes and ten seconds.

Track listing
 Digital download
 "Salva Mea" (Radio Edit) - 3:09
 "Salva Mea" (Extended Mix) - 7:22

Credits and personnel
Producers – Laurent Wery, Sir-G
Lyrics – Maxi Jazz, Ayalah Bentovim, Roland Armstrong
Label: LMDBM

Chart performance

Release history

References

External links
 Official Website
 Laurent Wery on Facebook

2011 singles
Laurent Wéry songs
2011 songs